Bonna Søndberg (born 17 August 1933) is a Danish former operatic soprano and singing educator. She first sung mezzo and made her on-stage debut as the housekeeper Marcellina in The Marriage of Figaro in 1955. Søndberg was employed by the Royal Danish Theatre one year later and she remained with the institution until her retirement in 1987. She is a Knight of the Order of the Dannebrog and a recipient of the Tagea Brandt Rejselegat.

Early life
She is the daughter of the tailor and tenor Jørgen Jensen and the pianist Sonja S. Hansen. At the age of four Søndberg began playing the piano but her father desired her to take up a career as a singer. She moved to Rødding when she was six years old, and was raised in the Southern Jutland town. Søndberg was taught English, piano and singing under a singing educator and later left school to do housework. Following a year's worth of studying, she accepted to study in Copenhagen and also worked at an insurance company to fund her education.

Career
In 1955, Søndberg had her debut role on stage singing mezzo as the housekeeper Marcellina in The Marriage of Figaro by Wolfgang Amadeus Mozart. She was employed at the Royal Danish Theatre the following year. Søndberg's breakthrough role came in Un ballo in maschera by Giuseppe Verdi, singing the role of Amelia in which she performed to the bass baritone Ib Hansen on stage in 1957. She was kept busy with other roles such as Ariadne in Richard Strauss' Ariadne auf Naxos, Elizabeth in Tannhäuser by Richard Wagner, Dido in Henry Purcell's Dido and Aeneas, Iphigenia in Iphigénie en Tauride by Christoph Willibald Gluck, Leonora in Verdi's The Troubadour and Alice Ford in Falstaff.

She received offers to sing on stage in foreign cities such as Bayreuth, London and New York but she rejected each and every one of them in that period of time. In 1959, Søndberg performed a number of songs in the collection Das Marienleben with the German composer Paul Hindemith and the Royal Danish Opera. She sung the part of the Governess in the horror opera The Turn of the Screw by Benjamin Britten in 1968. Søndberg was one of the first to perform music of Rued Langgaard, the late Romantic composer from the mid-1960s. She was cited as having begun a renaissance of the otherwise unknown Langgaard and she did concerts of Langgaard's music in countries such as Germany, Iceland, Norway and Sweden. Søndberg's final theatrical roles included Magdelone in Maskarade by Carl Nielsen and as Leokadja Begbick in Kurt Weill's Rise and Fall of the City of Mahagonny. In 1987, she retired from professional singing due to voice problems, and focused on working as a singing educator, training and mentoring multiple actors and singers.

Personal life
Søndberg has three children and has been married twice. Her first marriage to the typographer Flemming Søndberg lasted from 29 September 1953 to their divorce in 1957. Søndberg has been married to the editor Sten Uldal Rasmussen since 8 September 1979.

Legacy
In 1956, she received the Kaj Munk's Memorial Scholarship. Søndberg was appointed Knight of the Order of the Dannebrog in 1968 and the Tagea Brandt Rejselegat the following year. The Danish Radio Archive contains a number of live radio and television recordings of her singing in their collections. The Rødding Local History Archive has a number of newspapers about or authored by Søndberg from 1960 to 1980 in its collection.

References

External links
 

1933 births
Living people
20th-century Danish women opera singers
21st-century Danish women
Danish operatic sopranos
Women music educators
Singers awarded knighthoods
Knights of the Order of the Dannebrog